John Garfield (born  Jacob Julius Garfinkle; March 4, 1913 – May 21, 1952) was an American actor who played brooding, rebellious, working-class characters. He grew up in poverty in New York City. In the early 1930s, he became a member of the Group Theatre. In 1937, he moved to Hollywood, eventually becoming one of Warner Bros.' stars. He received Academy Award nominations for his performances in Four Daughters (1938) and Body and Soul (1947).

Called to testify before the U.S. Congressional House Committee on Un-American Activities (HUAC), he denied communist affiliation and refused to "name names", effectively ending his film career. Some have alleged that the stress of this persecution led to his premature death at 39 from a heart attack. Garfield is acknowledged as a predecessor of such Method actors as Marlon Brando, Montgomery Clift, and James Dean.

Early life

Jacob Garfinkle was born in a small apartment on Rivington Street in Manhattan's Lower East Side, to David and Hannah Garfinkle, Russian Jewish immigrants, and grew up in the heart of the Yiddish Theater District.  In early infancy, a middle name—Julius—was added, and for the rest of his life those who knew him well called him Julie. His father, a clothes presser and part-time cantor, struggled to make a living and to provide even marginal comfort for his small family. When Garfield was five, his brother Max was born. Their mother never fully recovered from what was described as a "difficult" pregnancy and birth. She died two years later, and the young boys were sent to live with various relatives, all poor, scattered across the boroughs of Brooklyn, Queens and The Bronx. Several of these relatives lived in tenements in a section of East Brooklyn called Brownsville, and there, Garfield lived in one house and slept in another. At school, he was judged a poor reader and speller, deficits that were aggravated by irregular attendance. He would later say of his time on the streets there, that he learned "all the meanness, all the toughness it's possible for kids to acquire."

His father remarried and moved to the West Bronx, where Garfield joined a series of gangs. Much later, he would recall: "Every street had its own gang. That's the way it was in poor sections... the old safety in numbers." He soon became a gang leader. At this time, people started to notice his ability to mimic well-known performers, both physically and facially. He also began to hang out and eventually spar at a boxing gym on Jerome Avenue. At some point, he contracted scarlet fever (it was diagnosed later in adulthood), causing permanent damage to his heart and causing him to miss a lot of school. After he was expelled three times and expressed a wish to quit school altogether, his father and step-mother sent him to P.S. 45, a school for difficult children. It was under the guidance of the school's principal—the educator Angelo Patri—that he was introduced to acting. Noticing Garfield's tendency to stammer, Patri assigned him to a speech therapy class taught by a charismatic teacher named Margaret O'Ryan. She gave him acting exercises and made him memorize and deliver speeches in front of the class and, as he progressed, in front of school assemblies. O'Ryan thought he had a natural talent and cast him in school plays. She encouraged him to sign up for a citywide debating competition sponsored by The New York Times. To his own surprise, he took second prize.

With Patri and O'Ryan's encouragement, he began to take acting lessons at a drama school that was part of The Heckscher Foundation and began to appear in their productions. At one of the latter, he received back-stage congratulations and an offer of support from the Yiddish actor Jacob Ben-Ami, who recommended him to the American Laboratory Theatre. Funded by the Theatre Guild, "the Lab" had contracted with Richard Boleslavski to stage its experimental productions and with Russian actress and expatriate Maria Ouspenskaya to supervise classes in acting. Former members of the Moscow Art Theatre, they were the first proponents of Konstantin Stanislavski's 'system' in the United States, which soon developed into what came to be known as "the Method." Garfield took morning classes and began volunteering time at the Lab after hours, auditing rehearsals, building and painting scenery, and doing crew work. He would later view this time as beginning his apprenticeship in the theater. Among the people becoming disenchanted with the Guild and turning to the Lab for a more radical, challenging environment were Stella Adler, Lee Strasberg, Franchot Tone, Cheryl Crawford and Harold Clurman. In varying degrees, all would become influential in Garfield's later career.

After a stint with Eva Le Gallienne's Civic Repertory Theater and a short period of vagrancy, involving hitchhiking, freight hopping, picking fruit, and logging in the Pacific Northwest (Preston Sturges conceived the film Sullivan's Travels after hearing Garfield tell of his hobo adventures), Garfield made his Broadway debut in 1932 in a play called Lost Boy. It ran for only two weeks but gave Garfield something critically important for an actor struggling to break into the theater: a credit.

There is a claim that he was a patron of Polly Adler's bordello or brothel in New York.

New York theater and the Group
Garfield received feature billing in his next role, that of Henry the office boy in Elmer Rice's play Counsellor-at-Law, starring Paul Muni. The play ran for three months, made an Eastern tour and returned for an unprecedented second, repeat engagement, only closing when Muni was contractually compelled to go back to Hollywood to make a film for Warners. At this point, Warner's expressed an interest in Garfield and sought a screen test. He turned them down.

Garfield's former colleagues Crawford, Clurman and Strasberg had begun a new theater collective, calling it simply "the Group," and Garfield lobbied his friends hard to get in. After months of rejection, he began frequenting the inside steps of the Broadhurst Theater where the Group had its offices. Cheryl Crawford noticed him one day and greeted him warmly. Feeling encouraged, he made his request for apprenticeship. Something intangible impressed her, and she recommended him to the other directors. They made no objection.

Clifford Odets had been a close friend of Garfield from the early days in the Bronx. After Odets' one-act play Waiting for Lefty became a surprise hit, the Group announced it would mount a production of his full-length drama Awake and Sing. At the playwright's insistence, Garfield was cast as Ralph, the sensitive young son who pleads for "a chance to get to first base." The play opened in February 1935, and Garfield was singled out by critic Brooks Atkinson for having a "splendid sense of character development." Garfield's apprenticeship was officially over; he was voted full membership by the company. Odets was the man of the moment, and he claimed to the press that Garfield was his "find" and that he would soon write a play just for him. That play would turn out to be Golden Boy, but when Luther Adler was cast in the lead role instead, a disillusioned Garfield began to take a second look at the overtures being made by Hollywood.

Warner Bros.

Garfield had been approached by Hollywood studios before—both Paramount and Warners offering screen tests—but talks had always stalled over a clause he wanted inserted in his contract, one that would allow him time off for stage work. Now Warner Bros. acceded to his demand, and Garfield signed a standard feature-player agreement—seven years with options—in Warner's New York office. Many in the Group were livid over what they considered his betrayal. Elia Kazan's reaction was different, suggesting that the Group did not so much fear that Garfield would fail, but that he would succeed. Jack Warner's first order of business was a change of name to John Garfield.

After many false starts, he was finally cast in a supporting, yet crucial role as a tragic young composer in a Michael Curtiz film titled Four Daughters (1938). After the picture's release, he received very positive notices and a nomination for the Academy Award for Best Supporting Actor. The studio quickly revised Garfield's contract—designating him a star player rather than a featured one—for seven years without options. They also created a name-above-the-title vehicle for him titled They Made Me a Criminal (1939). Before the success of Daughters, Garfield had made a B movie feature called Blackwell's Island (also 1939). Not wanting their new star to appear in a low-budget film, Warners ordered an A movie upgrade by adding $100,000 to its budget and recalling director Michael Curtiz to shoot newly scripted scenes.

Garfield's debut had a cinematic impact difficult to conceive in retrospect. As biographer Lawrence Swindell put it: 

His "honeymoon" with Warners over, Garfield entered a protracted period of conflict with the studio, with Warners attempting to cast him in crowd-pleasing melodramas like Dust Be My Destiny (also 1939) and Garfield insisting on quality scripts that would offer challenges and highlight his versatility. The result was often a series of suspensions, with Garfield refusing an assigned role and Warners refusing to pay him. Garfield's problem was shared by any actor working in the studio system of the 1930s: by contract, the studio had the right to cast him in any project they wanted to. But, as Robert Nott explains: 

A notable exception to this trend was Daughters Courageous (also 1939), a not-quite-sequel (same cast, different story and characters) to his debut film. The film did well critically, but failed to find an audience, the public being dissatisfied that it was not a true sequel (hard to pull off, since the original character Mickey Borden died in the first picture). The director, Curtiz, called the film "my obscure masterpiece."

At the onset of World War II, Garfield immediately attempted to enlist in the armed forces, but was turned down because of his heart condition.  Frustrated, he turned his energies to supporting the war effort. He and actress Bette Davis were the driving forces behind the opening of the Hollywood Canteen, a club offering food and entertainment for American servicemen. He traveled overseas to help entertain the troops, made several bond selling tours and starred in a string of patriotic box-office successes like Air Force, Destination Tokyo (both 1943) and Pride of the Marines (1945). He was particularly proud of the last film, based on the life of Al Schmid, a war hero blinded in combat. In preparing for the role, Garfield lived for several weeks with Schmid and his wife in Philadelphia and would blindfold himself for hours at a time.

After the war, Garfield starred in a series of successful films such as The Postman Always Rings Twice (1946) with Lana Turner, Humoresque (also 1946) with Joan Crawford, and Gentleman's Agreement (1947), an Oscar-winning Best Picture. In Gentleman's Agreement, Garfield took a featured, but supporting, part because he believed deeply in the film's exposé of antisemitism in America. He was nominated for the Academy Award for Best Actor for his starring role in Body and Soul (1947). That same year, Garfield returned to Broadway in the play Skipper Next to God. Strong-willed and often verbally combative, Garfield did not hesitate to venture out on his own when the opportunity arose. In 1946, when his contract with Warner Bros. expired, Garfield decided not to renew it and opted to start his own independent production company.

In 1949, he would again star in a Clifford Odets play, The Big Knife.

The Red Scare

Long involved in liberal politics, Garfield was caught up in the communist scare of the late 1940s and early 1950s. He supported the Committee for the First Amendment, which opposed governmental investigation of communist activity in Hollywood. When called to testify in 1951 before the House Committee on Un-American Activities, which was empowered to investigate communist infiltration in America, Garfield refused to name Communist Party members or followers, testifying that, indeed, he knew none in the film industry. Garfield rejected communism and, just prior to his death in hopes of redeeming himself in the eyes of the blacklisters, wrote that he had been duped by communist ideology in an unpublished article called "I Was a Sucker for a Left Hook", a reference to Garfield's movies about boxing. However, his forced testimony before the committee had severely damaged his reputation. He was blacklisted in Red Channels and barred from future employment as an actor by Hollywood movie studio bosses for the remainder of his career.

With film work scarce because of the blacklist, Garfield returned to Broadway and starred in a 1952 revival of Golden Boy, finally being cast in the lead role denied him years before.

Near the end of his life, in an effort to clear his name, Garfield began work on an article for Look magazine, in which he would denounce communism without "naming names"; his lawyer advised him to concede that he had been “duped" into contributing time and money to communist front groups. He then arranged to meet with the FBI to press his case. At the meeting, however, the FBI representatives showed him a dossier on his wife Robbe, which included her old Communist Party membership card and cancelled checks to events sponsored by the party, and said that the FBI would clear him if he signed a statement betraying Robbe as a Communist. Garfield instead responded with an angry expletive and  walked out of the meeting.

Death

On May 9, 1952, Garfield moved out of his New York apartment for the last time, indicating to friends that the separation from his wife Roberta was not temporary. He confided to columnist Earl Wilson that he would soon be divorced. Close friends speculated that it was his wife's opposition to his planned confession in Look magazine that triggered the separation. He heard that a HUAC investigator was reviewing his testimony for possible perjury charges. His agent reported that 20th Century-Fox wanted him for a film called Taxi but would not even begin talks unless the investigation concluded in his favor. Three actor friends, Canada Lee, Mady Christians and J. Edward Bromberg, had all recently died after being listed by the committee.

On the morning of May 20, Garfield, against his doctor's strict orders, played several strenuous sets of tennis with a friend, mentioning the fact that he had not been to bed the night before. He met actress Iris Whitney for dinner and afterward became ill, complaining that he felt chilled. She took him to her apartment, where he refused to let her call a doctor and instead went to bed. The next morning, she found him dead. Long-term heart problems, allegedly aggravated by the stress of his blacklisting, had led to his death at the age of 39.

The funeral was the largest in New York since Rudolph Valentino's, with over ten thousand people crowding the streets outside. The media circus surrounding Garfield's death led to a running joke, "John Garfield Still Dead Syndrome," that parodied the phenomenon; it would later be superseded by "Francisco Franco is still dead" in the 1970s after Franco's protracted terminal illness. Garfield's estate, valued at "more than $100,000," was left entirely to his wife. Shortly afterward, the HUAC closed its investigation of John Garfield, leaving him in the clear. Garfield was interred at Westchester Hills Cemetery in Hastings-on-Hudson, Westchester County, New York.

Personal life
He and Roberta Seidman married in February 1935. His wife had been a member of the Communist Party. They had three children: Katherine (1938 – March 18, 1945), who died of an allergic reaction; David (1943–1994); and Julie (born 1946), the latter two later becoming actors themselves.

Awards and nominations
Garfield was nominated for the Academy Award for Best Supporting Actor for Four Daughters in 1939 and Best Actor for Body and Soul in 1948.

He was given a star on the Hollywood Walk of Fame at 7065 Hollywood Boulevard.

Cultural references
In The Exorcist (1973), Detective Kinderman says Father Damien Karras "looks like a boxer," and more specifically John Garfield as he appeared in Body and Soul.

The protagonist in Thomas Pynchon's novel Inherent Vice, Larry "Doc" Sportello, discusses Garfield's film appearances throughout the detective story.

The John Prine song "The Late John Garfield Blues" is inspired by Garfield. The actor is also mentioned by Prine in "Picture Show", a song in the musician's Grammy Award-winning album The Missing Years.

In the film Hustle (1975), Burt Reynolds' character references Garfield during a discussion of screen heroes.

In the film Indecent Proposal (1993), When discussing the contract for one night with his wife, there is a “John Garfield” clause in the contract stating he pays even if he dies during the event.

Garfield is a character in Names, Mark Kemble's play about former Group Theatre members' struggles with the House Un-American Activities Committee.

Filmography

Feature films

Short subjects
 Swingtime in the Movies (1938)
 Meet the Stars #1: Chinese Garden Festival (1940)
 Show Business at War (1943)
 Screen Snapshots: The Skolsky Party (1946)
 Screen Snapshots: Out of This World Series (1947)

Documentary
 The John Garfield Story (2003) (available on Warner Home Video's 2004 DVD of The Postman Always Rings Twice)

Radio appearances

References

Further reading
 Morris, George. John Garfield. New York, Jove Publications, 1977

External links

 
 
 John Garfield – The first Rebel
 "The Jewish Brando", Tablet Magazine

1913 births
1952 deaths
20th-century American male actors
American male film actors
American male stage actors
American people of Russian-Jewish descent
Burials at Westchester Hills Cemetery
California Democrats
Hollywood blacklist
Jewish American male actors
Jewish activists
Male actors from New York City
New York (state) Democrats
Warner Bros. contract players
20th-century American Jews